Shahzada Mirza Muhammad Salim Shah  (1799 – 8 September 1836 ) (also known as Prince Mirza Salim Shah) was a son of Mughal emperor Akbar II and his consort Mumtaz-un-Nissa Begum. He was a younger brother of Emperor Bahadur Shah II, former Crown Prince Mirza Jahangir and Mirza Jahan Shah. He was his elder brother, Abu zafar's favourite brother. Salim always aged at Abu Zafar's decisions and always supported him.

Biography
His father ruled over a rapidly disintegrating empire between 1806 and 1837. It was during his time that the East India Company dispensed with the illusion of ruling in the name of the Mughal monarch and removed his name from the Persian texts that appeared on the coins struck by the company in the areas under their control.

His brother was not his father's preferred choice as his successor. One of Akbar Shah's queens, Mumtaz Begum, had been pressuring him to declare her son, Mirza Jahangir as his successor. The East India Company exiled Jahangir after he attacked their resident, Sir Archibald Seton, in the Red Fort.

The British tried to make him the appoint him as Heir Apparent on 26 September 1835 but refused to cave to his demands which is why his older brother, Mirza Abu Zafar Muhammad Bahadur took the throne as Emperor Bahadur Shah II.

Family
He married twice, both of whom were princesses of the Imperial family and his cousins. He had two sons and two daughters. He died in 1836 in the Red Fort, before the events of 1857 that ushered in the end of his dynasty and the rule of the Imperial family of India.

Sources

1799 births
1836 deaths
Mughal princes
Timurid dynasty
People from Delhi